Carlo Sabatini (7 April 1932 – 10 April 2020) was an Italian actor and voice actor.

Biography
Born in Rome, Sabatini began his career on film and television during the 1950s but he is perhaps best known as a voice actor. The many actors he dubbed included Ian McKellen, Morgan Freeman, Clint Eastwood, Donald Sutherland, Harvey Keitel, Bruce Lee, Kris Kristofferson, Alain Delon, Paul Newman, John Mahoney, Robert Duvall, Leonard Nimoy, and Marlon Brando.

In Sabatini’s character dubbing roles, he famously dubbed over the voice of Magneto (portrayed by Ian McKellen) in the X-Men film franchise as well as Morgan Freeman’s role as "Red" in the 1994 film The Shawshank Redemption. On television, Sabatini dubbed Josiah Bartlet (portrayed by Martin Sheen) in The West Wing and Philip Banks (portrayed by James Avery) in The Fresh Prince of Bel-Air. In Sabatini’s animated roles, he voiced Chilkoot in the Italian dub of Brother Bear 2.

In 2003, he acted in the mini-series , directed by Lodovico Gasparini.

Personal life
Sabatini was the father of voice actor Gabriele Sabatini.

Death
Sabatini died in Rome on 10 April 2020 just three days after his 88th birthday.

Filmography

Cinema
Senso (1954)
Il lavoro (1962)
Sacco & Vanzetti (1971)
Strangled Lives (1996)
Giovanni Paolo II (2005)
The Omen (2006)

Television
La gatta (1978)
Il sottoscritto Giuseppe Donati all'alta corte di giustizia (1983) - TV Film
Una fredda mattina di maggio (1990) - TV Film
 (2003)

Dubbing roles

Animation
Chilkoot in Brother Bear 2
Recruiting Officer in Valiant
Bob Shumway in ALF: The Animated Series

Live action
Erik Lehnsherr / Magneto in X-Men
Erik Lehnsherr / Magneto in X2
Erik Lehnsherr / Magneto in X-Men: The Last Stand
Erik Lehnsherr / Magneto in The Wolverine
Erik Lehnsherr / Magneto in X-Men: Days of Future Past
Will Gates in Restoration
Ellis Boyd "Red" Redding in The Shawshank Redemption
Lee in Enter the Dragon
Jacob Fuller in From Dusk till Dawn
Senator Roark in Sin City
Senator Roark in Sin City: A Dame to Kill For
David in Alice Doesn't Live Here Anymore
John Burnett in Dance with Me
Ken Murphy in He's Just Not That Into You
Josiah Bartlet in The West Wing
Philip Banks in The Fresh Prince of Bel-Air
Willard Kraft in Sabrina the Teenage Witch
Robert Koesler in The Rosary Murders
Douglas Thomas in The Art of War
Ed Gentry in Deliverance
Principal Dimly in Bratz
Francis Tierney Sr. in Pride and Glory
Earl Macklin in The Outfit
Roger Prynne in The Scarlet Letter
Dixon Doss in The Gingerbread Man
Captain Koons in Pulp Fiction
Hickey in Last Man Standing
Thomas Highway in Heartbreak Ridge
Tommy Nowak in Pink Cadillac
Jim Court in Say Anything...
Al in The Hudsucker Proxy
Poppy Burns in Dan in Real Life
Sven Sorenson in Free Money
Harry Ross in Twilight
Lord Percival Graves in King Ralph
James Graham in Rob Roy
Matt Johnson in Big Wednesday
Bubba Wilkes in The Undefeated
Prince Tancredi Falconeri in The Leopard
Dr. Chasuble in The Importance of Being Earnest
Bollingsworth in Chain of Fools
Dan August in Dan August
Norman Dale in Hoosiers
Reginald in Mr. Popper's Penguins
Donald Shellhammer in Miracle on 34th Street
Polonius in Hamlet

References

External links

1932 births
2020 deaths
Male actors from Rome
Italian male voice actors
Italian male film actors
Italian male stage actors
Italian male television actors
20th-century Italian male actors
21st-century Italian male actors